Downtown Moncton is a central neighbourhood  in the city of Moncton, New Brunswick.

History
See History of Moncton and Timeline of Moncton history

Places of note

References

Bordering communities

See also

List of neighbourhoods in Moncton
List of neighbourhoods in New Brunswick

Neighbourhoods in Moncton
Historic districts in Canada